The 1965 Ballon d'Or, given to the best football player in Europe as judged by a panel of sports journalists from UEFA member countries, was awarded to Eusébio on 28 December 1965.

Eusébio was the first Portuguese national to win the award and still is the only Benfica player to have won it.

Rankings

References

External links
 France Football Official Ballon d'Or page

1965
1965–66 in European football